Ponni rice is a variety of rice developed by Tamil Nadu Agricultural University in 1986. It is widely cultivated in Tamil Nadu, a state in India and is a hybrid variety of Taichung 65 and Myang Ebos 6080/2. Since the Kaveri River is also called 'Ponni' in Tamil literature, the rice could have been named after the river. The rice is mostly cultivated along the banks of the Kaveri in the cities of Ariyalur, Trichy, Madurai and its mouth.

See also
 List of rice varieties

External links
 Malaysian firm registers Ponni as trademark
The Hindu on a new variety of Ponni
A farmers' movement to protect ‘Ponni'
Wanted: ad blitzkrieg and patent for Ponni rice

Rice varieties
Agriculture in Tamil Nadu
Rice production in India